New Zealand and the Barbarians have played each other on 11 occasions. The first encounter was in February 1954 and saw New Zealand win 19–5 at Cardiff Arms Park, while the last was in November 2017, when New Zealand won 31–22 at Twickenham. All the matches have been played at two venues – Cardiff Arms Park and Twickenham. New Zealand have never played the Barbarians at home but have won 8 of the 11 matches.

Overall summary

Matches

References

Barbarian F.C. matches
New Zealand national rugby union team matches